Arctica is a genus of saltwater clams, marine bivalve mollusks in the family Arcticidae. In the present day this is a monotypic genus (contains only one species), however there are a number of additional species in the fossil record.

Species
Species within the genus Arctica include

Living species:
Arctica islandica Linnaeus, 1767

Fossil species: 
†Arctica limpidiana
†Arctica murrayensis
†Arctica provencialis
†Arctica subanthooensis

References

 AnimalBase info on the genus
 Paleobiology database info on the genus

External links 

Arcticidae
Bivalve genera